Dongbin Road is a major east-west road in Nanshan, Shenzhen, China. It starts west from Yueliangwan Boulevard in Qianhai and terminates at Shenzhen Bay Port in Dongjiaotou, which in turn is connected to Hong Kong via the Shenzhen Bay Bridge. A large portion of the Dongbin Tunnel is constructed under the street, which also runs to Shenzhen Bay Port. A number of the under construction Shenzhen Metro Line 9 stations will as well run underneath the road. The portion between Yueliangwan Boulevard and Nanhai Boulevard was named Neihuan Road before 2004.

Major Junctions
Qianhai Road
Nanshan Boulevard
Nanhai Boulevard
Houhai Boulevard
Houhaibin Road

Places along the road
Nanshan (mountain)
One Shenzhen Bay
Shenzhen Bay Port

References

Roads in Shenzhen
Nanshan District, Shenzhen